Saint-Préjet-d'Allier (literally Saint-Préjet of Allier) is a commune in the Haute-Loire department in south-central France.

Geography

Population

See also
Communes of the Haute-Loire department

References

External links
  Official Web site

Communes of Haute-Loire